Kim Tae-yun (born 28 September 1994) is a South Korean speed skater.

Kim competed at the 2014 Winter Olympics for South Korea. In the 1000 metres he finished 30th overall.

Kim made his World Cup debut in November 2013. As of September 2014, Kim's top World Cup finish is 6th in a 1000m B race at Salt Lake City in 2013–14. His best overall finish in the World Cup is 44th, in the 1000 metres in 2013–14.

At the 2018 Winter Olympics in Pyeongchang, Kim exceeded expectations by winning the bronze medal in the 1000 metres race.

References

External links

1994 births
Living people
South Korean male speed skaters
Speed skaters at the 2014 Winter Olympics
Speed skaters at the 2018 Winter Olympics
Olympic speed skaters of South Korea
People from Uijeongbu
Korea National Sport University alumni
Medalists at the 2018 Winter Olympics
Olympic medalists in speed skating
Olympic bronze medalists for South Korea
World Single Distances Speed Skating Championships medalists
Sportspeople from Gyeonggi Province
20th-century South Korean people
21st-century South Korean people